John Hartle (22 December 1933 - 31 August 1968) was an English professional road racer who competed in national, international and Grand Prix motorcycle events.

Motorcycling career

Born in Chapel-en-le-Frith, Derbyshire, Hartle began racing in 1952 when working for Eric Bowers Motorcycles, riding a BSA Gold Star at Brough Aerodrome, in the East Riding of Yorkshire, England. Gaining more experience at other nearby short circuits including Cadwell Park and Oulton Park in 1953, he also finished in three out of four races entered in the 1953 and 1954 Isle of Man Manx Grand Prix.

He rode for the works Norton team during the 1955 season and again in 1956 in what would be factory team's last year in Grand Prix racing, returning to ride for Eric Bowers in 1957.

MV Agusta signed him in 1958 at the urging of John Surtees. He ended the season as runner-up to Surtees in the 500 and 350 classes. In 1960 he won his first Isle of Man TT race, the Junior TT event. After being released by MV Agusta, he then rode for Geoff Duke's privateer Gilera team, alongside Derek Minter.

In his early career Hartle was sponsored for non-championship races by Eric W Bowers Coaches and later Comerfords, a large London retailer of roadgoing and sporting motorcycles, until his retirement in 1964.

He returned to racing during 1967, winning the Isle of Man inaugural Production Race 750 category for road-based machines on a Triumph Thruxton Bonneville, and scoring World Championship points in both 350 cc and 500 cc races.

Hartle was killed in 1968 after crashing at the Oliver's Mount circuit in Scarborough.

Hartle was proud of his connection with his hometown of Chapel-en-le-Frith, always carrying the coat of arms as his 'pudding basin' helmet emblem with the Latin motto Cava et Spera, which translates to 'Caution and Hope'. He was recognised in his hometown in 2010 by a blue wall-plaque attached to the building which now stands where he used to live.

John Hartle Trophy
The John Hartle Trophy is an annual award at the Isle of Man TT Races. The trophy is presented to the winner of the Superstock TT.

Motorcycle Grand Prix results 

(key) (Races in bold indicate pole position; races in italics indicate fastest lap)

References

External links
 Image of John Hartle Blue Plaque
 John Hartle profile at ozebook.com
John Hartle on Gilera, Ulster Grand Prix 1963

1933 births
1968 deaths
People from Chapel-en-le-Frith
Sportspeople from Derbyshire
British motorcycle racers
English motorcycle racers
250cc World Championship riders
350cc World Championship riders
500cc World Championship riders
Isle of Man TT riders
Motorcycle racers who died while racing
Sport deaths in England
Place of birth missing